Béni-Zmenzer is a town and commune in Tizi Ouzou Province in northern Algeria.

References

Communes of Tizi Ouzou Province